The 1978–79 Liga Alef season saw Hapoel Nazareth Illit (champions of the North Division) and Hapoel Beit Shemesh (champions of the South Division) win the title and promotion to Liga Artzit.

Promotion play-offs, held in neutral venue, introduced between the second placed clubs in each regional division. Hapoel Herzliya won over Maccabi Kiryat Gat, and became the third promoted club.

North Division

South Division

Promotion play-offs

Hapoel Herzliya promoted to Liga Artzit.

References
Herzliya: Best from the north Maariv, 13.5.79, Historical Jewish Press 
Kiryat Gat defeated only twice this season Maariv, 13.5.79, Historical Jewish Press 
Duo First & Shohat brought Hapoel Herzliya back to Liga Artzit Maariv, 20.5.79, Historical Jewish Press 

Liga Alef seasons
Israel
3